Sue Tibbs (October 6, 1934 – April 6, 2012) was an American politician who served in the Oklahoma House of Representatives from the 23rd district from 2000 to 2012.

She died of ovarian cancer on April 6, 2012, in Tulsa, Oklahoma at age 77.

References

1934 births
2012 deaths
Republican Party members of the Oklahoma House of Representatives
Deaths from cancer in Oklahoma
Women state legislators in Oklahoma